USS Champion may refer to the following ships operated by the United States Navy:

  a Continental xebec commanded by Captain James Josiah on the Delaware River in 1777
  an armed river steamer in service during the American Civil War
  a World War II minesweeper
  a mine countermeasures ship commissioned in 1991

Sources

United States Navy ship names